Tripsacum is a genus of plants in the grass family and native to the Western Hemisphere. Gamagrass is a common name for plants in this genus.

Species

formerly included

see Anthephora Apluda Chionachne Coelorachis Elionurus Hackelochloa Hemarthria Ischaemum Lasiurus Manisuris Microstegium Pogonatherum

References

External links
 Grassbase - The World Online Grass Flora

 
Bunchgrasses of North America
Bunchgrasses of South America
Poaceae genera
Taxa named by Carl Linnaeus
Andropogoneae